The Scouts of China or the General Association of the Scouts of China in full, is the national Scouting association of the Republic of China and represents the Scouting organization in Taiwan. It is a member of the World Organization of the Scout Movement. In 2011, the Scouts of China has 49,457 members.

History

Mainland China (1912–1949)
Following the birth of the Republic of China, the first Scout troop was organized by Reverend Yen Chia-lin in Wuchang on February 25, 1912 and the Scouting movement spread rapidly all over the country.

The General Association of the Scouts of China was formally established in Nanking, the former capital of the Republic of China in 1934, and became a member of the International Scout Bureau in 1937.  Many Scouts actively participated in the Second Sino-Japanese War from 1937 to 1945.

There were 570,000 registered members in 1941. 

Japanese military authorities did not consistently encourage the Scouting movement in occupied territories. Where local conditions were favorable, authorities would permit local Scouting or introduce Japanese-style Scouting, or Shōnendan, and sometimes even made this compulsory. On the other hand, where conditions were not favorable, and anti-Japanese sentiments were likely to be nurtured through Scouting, the authorities would prohibit it entirely. Taiwan was a colony of the Empire of Japan from 1895 until 1945, and Taiwan Boy Scouts/Shōnendan and other forms of pro-Japanese youth education had been introduced. Conversely, a number of Taiwanese boys were formed into a Shōnendan-style boy corps called Taiwan Shaoniantuan from 1939 through the 1940s to assist in Chinese resistance in the Second Sino-Japanese War.

Scouts of China in Taiwan (1945-)

In 1949, the ROC government withdrew to Taiwan, where it remains today. However, Scouting has continued in Taiwan under the name of the Scouts of China. The organization was reorganized in 1950 after the ROC government was relocated to Taipei, and resumed membership in the International Scout Bureau as Scouts of China.

Program

There are 5 programs or sections in the Scouts of China. They are Beaver Scout (稚齡童軍), Cub Scout (幼童軍), Scout (童軍), Senior Scout (行義童軍) and Rover Scout (羅浮童軍).

Beaver Scout is served for the children aged 6 to 8 including 3 ranks: Star (星星), Moon (月亮) and Sun (太陽).

Cub Scout is served for the children aged 8 to 12 including 4 ranks: Anor now, Scouts of China are promoting the development of Sea Scouts.

See also
Scouting in Mainland China
The Scout Association of Hong Kong
The Scout Association of Macau
Girl Scouts of Taiwan
Sun Li-jen
Yang Huimin
World Buddhist Scout Brotherhood

Footnotes

References

Further reading
Facts on World Scouting, Boy Scouts International Bureau, Ottawa, Canada, 1961

External links
 The official website of the General Association of the Scouts of China

World Organization of the Scout Movement member organizations
Scouting in Taiwan
Youth organizations established in 1912
1912 establishments in China